Kim Joo-ryoung (born September 10, 1976) is a South Korean actress. She is mainly known for portraying Han Mi-nyeo or Player No. 212 in the Netflix original web series Squid Game. For her performance, she was nominated for Best Actress in an Action Series at the 2nd Critics' Choice Super Awards.

Filmography

Film

Television series

Web series

Awards and nominations

Notes

References

External links
  

1976 births
Living people
South Korean film actresses
South Korean television actresses
20th-century South Korean actresses
21st-century South Korean actresses